Dimit'ri "Dito" Ivanovich Shanidze (8 February 1937 – 18 November 2010) was a Soviet weightlifter. He competed and won a silver medal in the men's featherweight for both the 1968 Summer Olympics and the 1972 Summer Olympics. He was born in Derchi, Imereti, Georgia.

He was also the world champion in 1972 and 1973, a silver medallist in 1968 and 1972, and a bronze medallist in 1969. He was the European champion in 1973, a silver medallist in 1968, 1969, and 1971, and a bronze medallist in 1974. 

He died in Tbilisi on 18 November 2010.

References

External links
 Dito Shanidze's obituary 

1937 births
2010 deaths
Male weightlifters from Georgia (country)
Russian male weightlifters
Soviet male weightlifters
Olympic medalists in weightlifting
Olympic weightlifters of the Soviet Union
Olympic silver medalists for the Soviet Union
Weightlifters at the 1968 Summer Olympics
Weightlifters at the 1972 Summer Olympics
Medalists at the 1968 Summer Olympics
Medalists at the 1972 Summer Olympics
Place of death missing